Kuparuk may refer to:
                                
Kuparuk Oil Field, in North Slope Borough, Alaska, United States
Kuparuk River, in North Slope Borough, Alaska, United States